Crataegus boyntonii is a species of hawthorn native to the southeastern United States. Its fruit are "yellow-green flushed with red". It is sometimes considered to be a synonym of Crataegus intricata.

References

boyntonii
Trees of the Eastern United States
Trees of the Southeastern United States
Flora of the Great Lakes region (North America)
Flora of North America